is a female Japanese runner who finished third at the 2009 Summer Universiade Women's half marathon event

References

1989 births
Living people
Japanese female long-distance runners
Universiade medalists in athletics (track and field)
Place of birth missing (living people)
Universiade bronze medalists for Japan
Medalists at the 2009 Summer Universiade
Medalists at the 2011 Summer Universiade
20th-century Japanese women
21st-century Japanese women